Angelovski is a Macedonian surname meaning 'angel' and may refer to:

Branislav Angelovski (b. 1977), Macedonian handball player
Igor Angelovski (b. 1976), Macedonian footballer and current manager
Nikola-Kole Angelovski (b. 1943), Macedonian actor and film director
Strašo Angelovski (b. 1959), Macedonian politician
Vladimir-Dadi Angelovski (1946–2012), Macedonian actor

See also
Angelov

Macedonian-language surnames